Francis Pipelin (born 7 July 1933) is a French former professional racing cyclist. He rode in four editions of the Tour de France.

References

External links
 

1933 births
Living people
French male cyclists
Sportspeople from Ille-et-Vilaine
Cyclists from Brittany